OCA or Oca may refer to:

Places and jurisdictions 
 The ancient town and bishopric Oca in Asia Minor (present Asia Turkey), now a Latin Catholic titular see
 The former Spanish Oca, modern Villafranca Montes de Oca, also see of a medieval bishopric (Auca), now a Latin Catholic titular see
 Oca (river), a tributary of the Ebro, Spain, having its source in the comarca of Montes de Oca
 Côte d'Azur Observatory, French name: Observatoire de la Côte d'Azur
 Cerro Armazones Observatory
 Orange County Airport, several airports in the United States
 Oregon Coast Aquarium
 Iruña de Oca, Spanish municipality

Business and society 
 Odisha Cricket Association, state cricket body of BCCI
 Open Content Alliance, consortium of organizations contributing to a publicly accessible archive of digitized texts
 Optimum currency area, geographical region which efficiently shares a single currency
 Oregon Citizens Alliance, conservative Christian political activist organization
 Organic Consumers Association, consumer protection and organic agriculture advocacy group
 Organization of Chinese Americans, national Asian Pacific American social and civic organization
 Oxford Conservative Association, student political organisation at the University of Oxford

Education
 Oakland Charter Academy, a member school of Amethod Public Schools
 Ontario College of Art, former name for OCAD University
 Open College of the Arts

Government 
 Court of Appeal for Ontario, frequently referred to as the Ontario Court of Appeal 
 Office of Consumer Affairs (Canada), government agency of Industry Canada  
 Olympic Council of Asia, governing body of sports in Asia 
 Organised and Financial Crime Agency of New Zealand, formerly known as the Organised Crime Agency
 Organized Crime Agency of British Columbia (1999–2004), predecessor of the Combined Forces Special Enforcement Unit
 Outback Communities Authority, an authority providing municipal services to communities in Outback South Australia

Medicine 
 OCA1, a gene associated with oculocutaneous albinism
 Oculocutaneous albinism, a form of albinism involving the eyes and skin

Religion 
 Orthodox Church in America, autocephalous Eastern Orthodox Church in North America
 Oxford Capacity Analysis, also known as the American Personality Analysis, a personality test used in Scientology
 Oca (bishopric), a now titular Catholic see in Asia Minor

Technology 
 Odoo Community Association, an organization supporting the Odoo (formerly OpenERP) community
 Open Control Architecture, network control protocol for audio and video devices (AES70)
 Optically Clear Adhesives, bonding agents used for light-emitting devices like OLED and LEC; see Liquid optically clear adhesive
 Oracle Certified Associate, a level of the Oracle Certification Program

Other uses 
 Oca (structure), a kind of Brazilian indigenous dwelling
 Oxalis tuberosa, a South American tuber known as oca in Spanish
 Offensive counter air, military term
 Old Croton Aqueduct, especially when referring to the hiking trail
 Open coloring axiom in mathematics
 Operation Crossroads Africa, a volunteer organization
 Optical clearing agent, substance used in microscopy to make samples transparent
 Orange County Astronomers, an amateur astronomy club based in Orange County, California

See also
 Oka